Stanley A. Prokop (July 29, 1909 – November 11, 1977) was a Democratic U.S. Representative from Pennsylvania from 1959 to 1961.

Prokop was born in Throop, Pennsylvania, in Lackawanna County, and attended Villanova University.  Upon the outbreak of World War II, he enlisted in the United States Army as a private, serving in the 30th Infantry Division.  During the war, he rose to the rank of captain.  Following the war, he served on the North Pococno Joint Board of Education for 10 years, and following this was elected to the United States Congress in 1958, defeating incumbent Republican Congressman Joseph L. Carrigg.

Prokop was to serve but a single term, being defeated for re-election by future Pennsylvania governor William Scranton, a moderate Republican, in 1960.  Prokop's public service was not ended by this defeat, however, as he served as Lackawanna County's Director of Veterans' Affairs for 14 years.  He moved to Lake Ariel, Pennsylvania during this time, and was residing there at the time of his death, which occurred on Veterans Day.  His remains were interred at St. Catherine Cemetery in Moscow, Pennsylvania.

References

1909 births
1977 deaths
United States Army personnel of World War II
Villanova University alumni
People from Lackawanna County, Pennsylvania
American politicians of Polish descent
Military personnel from Pennsylvania
Democratic Party members of the United States House of Representatives from Pennsylvania
20th-century American politicians
School board members in Pennsylvania
United States Army officers